SS Joe C. S. Blackburn was a Liberty ship built in the United States during World War II. She was named after Joe C. S. Blackburn, a member of the U.S. House of Representatives from Kentucky's 7th district, a United States senator from Kentucky, and a Governor of the Panama Canal Zone.

Construction
Joe C. S. Blackburn was laid down on 30 October 1943, under a Maritime Commission (MARCOM) contract, MC hull 1508, by J.A. Jones Construction, Brunswick, Georgia; sponsored by Mrs. Robert Haynes, she was launched on 15 December 1943.

History
She was allocated to the Black Diamond Steamship Company, on 27 December 1943. On 20 August 1946, she was  laid up in the National Defense Reserve Fleet in Wilmington, North Carolina. On 28 May 1948, she was laid up in the National Defense Reserve Fleet in Astoria, Oregon. On 28 November 1967, she was sold to Zidell Explorations, Inc., for $54,001, to be scrapped. She was withdrawn from the fleet on 19 December 1967. Most source say she was converted into a floating dock in 1968. Her fate is unknown.

References

Bibliography

 
 
 
 
 

 

Liberty ships
Ships built in Brunswick, Georgia
1943 ships
Wilmington Reserve Fleet
Astoria Reserve Fleet